R. W. "Rube" Betchtel was an American football and basketball coach.  He served as the head football coach at Baldwin–Wallace College—now known as Baldwin Wallace University—from 1922 to 1923 and at Albion College from 1924 to 1926, compiling a career college football coaching record of 22–17–4.  Betchtel was also the head basketball coach at Baldwin–Wallace from 1922 to 1924 and Albion  from 1924 to 1927, tallying a career college basketball coaching mark of 56–28.

Head coaching record

Football

References

External links
 Encyclopedia of Baldwin Wallace University History: Ruben W. Betchtel
 Pro Football Archive profile

Year of birth missing
Year of death missing
Albion Britons athletic directors
Albion Britons football coaches
Albion Britons men's basketball coaches
Baldwin Wallace Yellow Jackets football coaches
Baldwin Wallace Yellow Jackets men's basketball coaches